Nora Holstad Berge (born 26 March 1987) is a retired Norwegian footballer who played as a defender for NWSL club North Carolina Courage and the Norway national team. In the past, she has played for FK Larvik, Kolbotn, Linköpings FC, Arna-Bjørnar, and FC Bayern Munich.

Holstad Berge has seen playing time with the national team during a number of major tournaments, including the 2011 World Cup, 2013 European Championship, 2015 World Cup, and 2017 European Championship.

Honours

FC Bayern Munich
 Bundesliga: Winner 2015, 2016

Kolbotn Fotball
 Norwegian Women's Cup: Winner 2007
 Toppserien: Winner 2006

References

External links

 
 Profile at fussballtransfers.com 	
 Profile at soccerdonna.de 
 
 
 

1987 births
Living people
Norwegian women's footballers
Norway women's international footballers
Norwegian expatriate women's footballers
Expatriate women's footballers in Sweden
Expatriate women's footballers in Germany
Norwegian expatriate sportspeople in Sweden
Norwegian expatriate sportspeople in Germany
Footballers from Oslo
Linköpings FC players
Damallsvenskan players
FC Bayern Munich (women) players
Toppserien players
Kolbotn Fotball players
Arna-Bjørnar players
Women's association football defenders
2015 FIFA Women's World Cup players
Frauen-Bundesliga players
Expatriate women's soccer players in the United States
Norwegian expatriate sportspeople in the United States
2011 FIFA Women's World Cup players
National Women's Soccer League players
UEFA Women's Euro 2017 players